Dimitris Bogdanos (spatial-alien) (Greek: Δημήτρης Μπόγδανος; born October 26, 1975) is a Greek former professional basketball player. At a height of 2.02 m (6' 7 ") in height, he played at both the small forward and power forward positions.

Professional career
During his professional club career, Bogdanos played with clubs such as: Ionikos NF, AEL Larissa, Panorama, Trikala 2000, and Gymnastikos S. Larissas.

External links 
ProBallers.com Profile
Basketball-Reference.com Profile
Eurobasket.com Profile
Greek Basket League Profile 

Living people
1975 births
A.E.L. 1964 B.C. players
Greek men's basketball players
Gymnastikos S. Larissas B.C. players
Ionikos N.F. B.C. players
Kavala B.C. players
Olympia Larissa B.C. players
Power forwards (basketball)
Small forwards
Trikala B.C. players
Basketball players from Athens